Alfred Eder (born 28 December 1953) is an Austrian former biathlete.

Life and career
Eder was born in Piesendorf, and has been a soldier and thus competed as a member of the Heeressportverein (army sports club) Saalfelden. He competed in six Winter Olympics, and jointly holds the Austrian record for most Winter Olympic appearances along with Mario Stecher and Markus Prock. He is the father of biathlete Simon Eder and was a coach of the Austrian biathlon team. He received a life ban from the Austrian Olympic Committee in 2007 as one of 14 team officials who were implicated in doping activity at the 2006 Winter Olympics. The bans on Eder and 11 others were subsequently rescinded in 2009, after the Fédération Internationale de Ski dropped doping charges against Eder, biathlon director for the Austrian ski federation Markus Gandler and cross-country ski coach Gerald Heigl.

Eder was appointed as Klaus Siebert's replacement as coach of the Belarusian biathlon squad ahead of the 2014–15 season.

Biathlon results
All results are sourced from the International Biathlon Union.

Olympic Games

*Sprint was added as an event in 1980.

World Championships
2 medals (2 bronze)

*During Olympic seasons competitions are only held for those events not included in the Olympic program.
**Team was added as an event in 1989.

Individual victories
1 victory (1 Sp)

*Results are from UIPMB and IBU races which include the Biathlon World Cup, Biathlon World Championships and the Winter Olympic Games.

See also
 List of athletes with the most appearances at Olympic Games

References

External links
 
 

1953 births
Living people
Austrian soldiers
Austrian male biathletes
Biathletes at the 1976 Winter Olympics
Biathletes at the 1980 Winter Olympics
Biathletes at the 1984 Winter Olympics
Biathletes at the 1988 Winter Olympics
Biathletes at the 1992 Winter Olympics
Biathletes at the 1994 Winter Olympics
Olympic biathletes of Austria
Biathlon World Championships medalists
Cross-country skiing coaches
Austrian sports coaches